Gabriela, giros del destino (Gabriela, Turns of Destiny) is a 2009 Colombian telenovela produced and broadcast by Caracol TV. Before its release, it was known as Nadie rueda como Gabriela Rueda.

Plot 
Gabriela, Destiny rounds
Gabriela Rueda (Carolina Gaitán) is a 23-year-old woman from a middle class background, passionate for skating, dreaming of becoming successful in that sport. Pablo Córdoba (Andrés Toro) belongs to a rich family, being son of Efraín (Luis Fernando Múnera), the owner of Malterías Tropical, a big beverage company, living as a womanizer, with nothing to worry about.

Their paths cross each other in the worst way. Gabriela travels to Cartagena, seeking to qualify for the Colombia's national roller skating team. When she is training, Pablo, driving his car after having an argument with his girlfriend Martina (Fiona Horsey), knocks Gabriela down. Pablo takes Gabriela to the hospital, but when he was to be questioned by the police, his family lawyer asks him to leave for the United States. Gabriela, who does not know who knocked her down, recovers but is told that she will never be able to skate again, ruining her dreams of becoming a professional skater, but will later be able to skate.

Six months later, Pablo comes back to Colombia, set to become the manager of the company his father runs. But Efraín decides to make Pablo to work for his company as a common employee for one year, hiding his true origins. Gabriela manages to get a job at Malterías Tropical, where her neighbour Ernesto Zárate (John Álex Toro), who is interested in her, works as an executive. Meanwhile, Verónica Maldonado (Carolina Sepúlveda), who also happened to work at the factory, knows who Pablo really is and feels attracted to him. Pablo tries to vindicate himself with Gabriela, but, unable to tell her he was who knocked her down in Cartagena, ends falling in love with her.

References

External links
  Official website
  Gabriela, giros del destino on the Caracol TV International catalogue
 

2009 telenovelas
2009 Colombian television series debuts
2010 Colombian television series endings
Colombian telenovelas
Caracol Televisión telenovelas
Spanish-language telenovelas
Television shows set in Bogotá
Television shows set in Cartagena, Colombia